Bang, Zoom, Crazy... Hello is the seventeenth studio album by American rock band Cheap Trick. The album was released on April 1, 2016, by Big Machine Records. The album is the first in the band's history to not feature Bun E. Carlos on drums. Touring drummer Daxx Nielsen fills in on drums for the album.

Singles
"No Direction Home" was released as the lead single from the album on December 20, 2015. The song was offered as a free download to celebrate their announced Rock and Roll Hall of Fame induction, as well as their record deal with Big Machine Records. In March 2016, the second single "When I Wake Up Tomorrow" was released. A music video was recorded for the song.

Critical reception

Bang, Zoom, Crazy... Hello received generally positive reviews from music critics. At Metacritic, which assigns a normalized rating out of 100 to reviews from mainstream critics, the album received an average score of 74 based on 12 reviews, which indicates "generally favorable reviews".

Commercial performance
In the United States, the album debuted at number 31 on the Billboard 200, becoming the band's highest-charting album in the U.S. since Lap of Luxury in 1988, and sold 14,000 copies in its first week. The album dropped to number 134 the next week on the Billboard 200, and was completely off the chart in the next two weeks.

Track listing

Personnel
 Robin Zander – lead vocals, guitar solo on "Do You Believe Me?"
 Rick Nielsen – lead guitar, background vocals
 Tom Petersson – bass, background vocals
 Daxx Nielsen – drums, background vocals
 Wayne Kramer – guitar solo on "Do You Believe Me?"
 Tim Lauer, Zac Rae, Bennett Salvay – keyboards
 Robin T. Zander, Johnny Keach, Chris Deaton, Julian Raymond – background vocals

Charts

References

2016 albums
Cheap Trick albums
Big Machine Records albums
Albums produced by Julian Raymond